The 1903 FA Cup final was an association football match between Bury and Derby County on Saturday, 18 April 1903 at the Crystal Palace stadium in south London. It was the final match of the 1902–03 FA Cup, the 32nd edition of the world's oldest football knockout competition, and England's primary cup competition, the Football Association Challenge Cup, better known as the FA Cup.

Bury were appearing in their second final and Derby County in their third – Bury won the cup in 1900 while Derby were runners-up in 1898 and 1899. As members of the Football League First Division, both teams were exempt from the competition's qualifying phase and, having entered in the first round proper, progressed through four rounds to the final.

The final was watched by a crowd of 63,102 and Bury, leading 1–0 at half-time, won a one-sided match 6–0 with goals by Joe Leeming (2), George Ross, Charlie Sagar, Willie Wood and Jack Plant. Bury's six-goal victory remains the record winning margin in FA Cup finals, though it was equalled in the 2019 final when Manchester City defeated Watford by the same score. Bury were the second team to score six in a final, following Blackburn Rovers in the 1890 final; and also the second team to win the cup without conceding a goal in the entire competition, following Preston North End in the 1888–89 tournament.

1903 background
The FA Cup, known officially as The Football Association Challenge Cup, is an annual knockout association football competition in men's domestic English football. The competition was first proposed on 20 July 1871 by C. W. Alcock at a meeting of The Football Association committee. The tournament was first played in the 1871–72 season and is the world's oldest association football competition. The 1903 match between Bury and Derby County at Crystal Palace was the 32nd final and the third of the 20th century. Bury were appearing in the final for the second time, having defeated Southampton 4–0 in 1900. Derby County were appearing in their third final, having lost the previous two by 3–1 to Nottingham Forest in 1898 and by 4–1 to Sheffield United in 1899.

Bury and Derby County were both members of the Football League First Division. In the 1902–03 league championship, they amassed 35 points each, seven points behind champions The Wednesday. With identical win–loss records, Bury were placed eighth and Derby ninth as Bury had a slightly better goal ratio.

The Derby team was managed by Harry Newbould who in 1900 had become the first person to be formally appointed to the position, having previously had charge of the team as club secretary. Bury's team between 1895 and 1907 was selected by a three-man committee but with club secretary Harry Spencer Hamer in charge of the team on match days.

Route to the final

Bury

Bury entered the competition in the first round proper and played four matches en route to the final. All four of their opponents were other teams in the First Division.

Early rounds
In the first round, Bury were drawn at home against Wolverhampton Wanderers. With a goal after sixty minutes by Billy Richards, Bury won the tie 1–0 at Gigg Lane and progressed to the second round. The crowd was only 5,172.

In the second round, Bury faced a formidable hurdle after they were drawn away to the FA Cup holders and current league title contenders Sheffield United. The tie was decided by a fifth-minute goal scored by Charlie Sagar and Bury won 1–0 at Bramall Lane before a crowd of 24,103.

This victory generated tremendous interest in the town of Bury and, when the team faced Notts County at home in the third round, the crowd was 22,841. Bury again won 1–0, courtesy of a Jimmy Lindsay penalty early in the second half.

Semi-final
The semi-finals were staged at neutral venues on Saturday, 21 March, and Bury were drawn to play the eventual Division One runners-up Aston Villa at Goodison Park. The crowd was around 50,000 including a sizeable contingent from Bury. Villa were clear favourites to win but it was Bury who dominated the match and they won 3–0 with surprising ease to qualify for their second final in four seasons. The goals at Goodison were scored by Jack Plant after thirty minutes, Sagar (48) and Richards (60). After the semi-final, Bury played four league matches before the final on 18 April and managed to complete these without any of their first-team players sustaining injury.

Derby County

Derby County entered the competition in the first round proper and played four matches en route to the final. Two of their opponents were other teams in the First Division. They also played against one team in the Second Division and one in the Southern League.

Early rounds
In the first round, Derby were drawn at home against Small Heath, who were successfully chasing promotion from the Second Division. Watched by a crowd of 15,000, Derby won 2–1 at the Baseball Ground with goals by John Boag and Joe Warrington. Small Heath's goal was scored by Jimmy Windridge.

In the second round, Derby were drawn away to relegation-threatened Blackburn Rovers and eased through with a 2–0 win. Their goals were scored by Steve Bloomer and Warrington.

They faced First Division opposition again in the third round and defeated Stoke FC 3–0 at home before a crowd of 16,000. The goals were scored by George Davis, Warrington and Ben Warren.

Semi-final
In their semi-final, Derby were drawn against Millwall Athletic, who were then in the Southern League. The match was played at neutral Villa Park and Derby won 3–0 with goals by Boag, Warren and George Richards. The semi-final was played on 21 March and, up to that point, Derby had been in serious contention for the league title. In their next league match on 28 March, they lost to Everton and a slide began with only one more win in their remaining league fixtures.

Derby were hidebound by injuries in this period. Their star forward Steve Bloomer sustained a swollen ankle that kept him out of the final and he was joined on the sidelines by regular halfback Charlie Leckie. Left winger George Davis was temporarily sidelined but was fit for the final. The most significant injury in terms of the final, however, was a groin strain suffered by goalkeeper Jack Fryer when stretching to reach a cross against Middlesbrough at Ayresome Park on Easter Monday, 13 April, just five days before the final.

Match

Pre-match

As both teams normally wore white shirts and blue shorts, agreement was needed about who should change kit but both clubs claimed priority of choice. The issue was referred to the FA who refused to get involved. Unable to reach agreement, both clubs conceded the argument and neither team wore its normal kit. Bury turned out in Cambridge blue shirts and navy blue shorts, Derby in red shirts and black shorts.

On the Friday afternoon and Saturday morning before the match, seven long special trains left the two Bury stations, Knowsley Street and Bolton Street, for the Crystal Palace. These alone accounted for around 2,000 of a large Bury contingent and thousands travelled from Derby also. An estimated 79 special trains were run to London from various points around England and all the major railway stations in the capital were well-stocked with provisions. At St Pancras, three special rooms were set aside for fans with some 40 barrels of beer, 200 cases of bottled beer, and a plentiful supply of whisky on hand.

Derby arrived at the ground with worries about the fitness of Bloomer and Fryer. Bloomer declared himself unfit but Fryer refused to stand aside for his understudy, Frank Davies, who had never played at senior level. Despite their problems, Derby began the match as favourites given their league form to the end of March, although they were now out of title contention. Bury had no team problems and could field their full first-choice eleven, including six players who had won the cup three years earlier: Joe Leeming, Plant, Richards, George Ross, Sagar and Willie Wood.

The local Bury Times newspaper carried a report which said many photographers were in evidence and a cinematograph was sited on top of one of the stands. The teams came onto the field separately, Derby first, and the Bury newspaper claimed that the roar of the Bury fans "outclassed" that of the Derby fans. The paper commented that, "strangely", the match kicked off at 3:27 pm.

First half
The weather was dry but the pitch was described as hard and uneven. The pitch seems to have helped Bury take the lead after twenty minutes when their captain George Ross aimed a lofted shot goalwards and the ball bounced awkwardly to deceive Jack Fryer before looping over his head. If Fryer had been fully fit, he would probably have saved the goal.

Bury led by this goal at half-time when, according to the Derby camp, things had gone "better than they had dared hope" – they were a goal down but didn't consider Bury's lead an insurmountable deficit. While Bury had been the better team so far and certainly deserved their lead, it had taken a desperate goal-line clearance by Ross to prevent a Derby goal after goalkeeper Hugh Monteith had been well beaten.

Second half
Bury began the second half in complete control and Derby's play was so poor that Bury were never fully extended. Monteith had very little to do while, at the other end, it was soon clear that Fryer should not have been playing at all. He aggravated his injury when he tried to prevent Charlie Sagar scoring the second Bury goal three minutes after the interval. The two players had collided and Fryer was forced to leave the field for treatment. With no substitutes allowed, Derby were down to ten men. Left back Charlie Morris deputised for Fryer but, after 56 minutes, Joe Leeming chipped the ball over him as he raced out of his goal and that gave Bury a 3–0 lead.

Fryer returned at this point but, only a minute later, after he had parried a shot by Frank Thorpe, Willie Wood scored the fourth Bury goal. Only two minutes later, it was 5–0 after Jack Plant cut inside from the left and hit a hard shot into the corner of the goal. Bury had scored four goals in an eleven-minute period.

Morris soon had to take over from Fryer again, but no one would have stopped Bury's sixth goal after 75 minutes when Leeming received a pass from Thorpe and sent it crashing into the net. Bury hit the woodwork twice more, and the game descended into near farce when Jimmy Methven went in goal to give Morris a breather. He should have conceded an immediate penalty when he handled the ball before the referee had been told about the change of roles. The Derby history suggests the referee, Jack Adams of Birmingham, must have felt sorry for them because he waved play on.

Details

Post-match
Afterwards, the trophy was presented to Bury captain George Ross by Lord Kinnaird who was himself a famous footballer, having played in a record nine FA Cup finals from 1873 to 1883. Each of the players was presented with a winner's medal. The club's officials and players spent the weekend celebrating at London's Tavistock Hotel before travelling to Birmingham on the Monday for a league match at The Hawthorns against West Bromwich Albion.

Bury's 6–0 victory created a record for the biggest winning margin in an FA Cup final, beating Blackburn's 6–1 win over The Wednesday in 1890. Manchester City equalled the record when they defeated Watford 6–0 in the 2019 final. Bury equalled Blackburn's record for the most goals scored in a final and also equalled the record first set by Preston North End in 1889 of winning the FA Cup without conceding a goal in any round.

Despite Bury's achievements, the match has been decried as one of the poorest and most one-sided cup finals ever played. The Daily Chronicle reported that the match was a "fiasco" and nothing like it had ever been seen before. The reporter contended that Bury could have scored twenty and did not do so because they "exercised mercy".

The 1903 match was Bury's last final appearance. Derby have reached the final once since 1903, when they defeated Charlton Athletic 4–1 after extra time in 1946.

Notes

References

Bibliography

External links
 Match report at www.fa-cupfinals.co.uk

1903
1902–03 FA Cup
Bury F.C. matches
Derby County F.C. matches
April 1903 sports events
1903 sports events in London